Dean Street is a street in Soho, central London, running from Oxford Street south to Shaftesbury Avenue.

Historical figures and places

In 1764 Wolfgang Amadeus Mozart, then a young boy, gave a recital at 21 Dean Street.

Admiral Nelson stayed in Dean Street the day before setting sail for the Battle of Trafalgar. He spent the night drawing up his final battleplans, including the masterstroke of painting identifiable gold and black checks on the ships. He is said to have spent the early part of the evening at a nearby undertakers selecting the coffin he would like to be buried in were the battle not to go according to plan, which proved to be time well spent, for he died in the battle despite leading the British fleet to victory.

Charles Dickens was also a regular on Dean Street when he was a young actor enthusiastically participating in amateur productions at Fanny Kelly's Royalty Theatre at number 73–74. In 1845 he starred in an adaptation of Ben Jonson's Every Man in his Humour, which met mixed reviews; Dickens' acting was said to be of debatable merit. Dickens's artistic contemporary George Cruikshank was also a resident of Dean Street and it was here that he drew the illustration for Dickens's early works. Cruikshank is perhaps best known as a cutting caricaturist with scant regard for his targets. He was once bribed £100 for his pledge not to "caricature His Majesty (George III) in any immoral situation." He obliged and instead created a humorous caricature of England which came to be known as John Bull.

Furniture maker William Hean lived in Dean Street between 1827 and 1845. Karl Marx lived at 28 Dean Street between 1851 and 1856, above what is now the Hart Brothers restaurant Quo Vadis. The Marxes shared their house in Dean Street with Italian teachers and a cook and were very poor while living in the street. Their rooms were described by one visitor as "One of the worst, therefore one of the cheapest, quarters of London..." Three of their five children died while living here, all in infancy. Marx's collaborator Friedrich Engels also lived in an apartment at 28 Dean Street.

The French House in Dean Street is a public house that was the unofficial headquarters of Charles de Gaulle and the French resistance during World War II.

Sectors
The street has an association with healthcare. Over the years there have been various hospitals on the street including pioneering establishments for prevention and cure of diseases. The Royal Ear Hospital occupied number 10. An early maternity hospital was also located here and the Lock Hospital too was in Dean Street, Lock being a euphemism for venereal disease. Today there are two Sexual Health clinics on Dean Street: 56 Dean Street, and Dean Street Express at number 34, opposite Royalty Mews.

Dean Street has in recent years been a centre of the creative and advertising industries including film and video editing facilities; this was especially true from the 1960s to the 1990s.

There have been many music and theatre venues on the street, including the Soho Theatre, which presents new plays and stand-up comedy. The celebrated Gargoyle Club ran for 27 years in the upper floors at number 69, an address that also housed the nightclub Billy's in its cellars during the late 1970s. There, New Romanticism, a landmark youth movement, took root.

Modern history

On 10 July 2009 a fire broke out on Dean Street. Two firefighters suffered minor injuries but nobody else was hurt. The building that caught fire was gutted.

The start of a dramatic change to Dean Street began in March 2010 as the demolition commenced of an entire block (Great Chapel Street and Dean Street) in preparation for a western entrance to the new Crossrail station at Tottenham Court Road, which would have a major impact on the area.

Intersections 
From north to south:
 Oxford Street – terminates
 Carlisle Street
 St Anne's Court
 Richmond Buildings (leading to Richmond Mews)
 Chapone Place
 Bateman Street
 Meard Street
 Bourchier Street
 Old Compton Street
 Romilly Street
 Shaftesbury Avenue – terminates

References

External links
 LondonTown.com information
 Panoramic view at the junction with Old Compton Street

Streets in the City of Westminster
2009 in London
Fires in London
2009 fires in the United Kingdom
Streets in Soho